Cold spray may refer to:
 Gas dynamic cold spray, or cold spraying, a powder coating deposition method
 Freeze spray, a type of aerosol spray used to rapidly cool surfaces in industrial and medical applications
 Cold electrospray ionization, a technique used in mass spectrometry to produce ions